James Gladwin Wynyard (17 August 1914 – 2 November 1942) was a New Zealand rugby union player. As a loose forward, he represented the All Blacks from 1935 to 1938, never playing a full test. He was part of the squad for the 1935–36 New Zealand rugby union tour of Britain, Ireland and Canada. His career was cut short by World War Two. He served as a captain in the Divisional Cavalry, and was killed in action at the Battle of El Alamein in 1942.

References

1914 births
1942 deaths
New Zealand rugby union players
New Zealand military personnel killed in World War II
People from Kihikihi
New Zealand military personnel of World War II
Rugby union players from Waikato
People educated at New Plymouth Boys' High School